This is a list of the Spanish Singles number-ones of 1967.

Chart history

See also
1967 in music
List of number-one hits (Spain)

References

1967
Spain Singles
Number-one singles